Marc Vann (born August 23, 1954) is an American actor. He is known for his role as Conrad Ecklie in the CBS television series CSI: Crime Scene Investigation. He also had notable roles in Angel and Early Edition.

Vann was born in Norfolk, Virginia. He initially had little interest in acting or theater, but he was introduced to the craft through a mime workshop while studying for his MBA. He subsequently got involved in theater before moving to L.A. to start a career as a television actor. Vann was active in local and regional theater in the Chicago area most memorably in his early career at Wisdom Bridge Theatre and Center Theatre.  He added immeasurably to the success of the Wisdom Bridge Theatre production of The Great Gatsby that also starred the actor Harry Lennix, who was race/color blind cast as Gatsby.

On February 28, 2008, Vann pulled off a special feat, guest starring back to back in new episodes of two different series, both on ABC.  First, he played a ship's doctor on the cult phenomenon Lost, and then played an automotive worker who was bribed into moving to Hawaii and not testifying in a trial in Eli Stone. He was recently in a "Skittles" commercial as the doctor. In 2011 he appeared in two episodes of Torchwood: Miracle Day as camp manager Colin Maloney.

Filmography

Theatre

Goodman Theatre
All The Rage

Victory Gardens Theatre
Flyovers

Steppenwolf Theatre Company
Hysteria .... Salvador Dalí

References

External links

1954 births
American male film actors
American male television actors
American male stage actors
Living people
Actors from Norfolk, Virginia
Male actors from Virginia
20th-century American male actors